Consthum is a village and a former commune in northern Luxembourg, in the canton of Clervaux.

On January 1, 2012, the commune merged with Hoscheid and Hosingen communes to form Parc Hosingen commune.

, the village of Consthum, which lies in the south of the commune, had a population of 292.

Former commune
The former commune consisted of the villages:

 Consthum
 Holzthum
 Geyershof (lieu-dit)

 
Communes in Clervaux (canton)
Villages in Luxembourg